Stefan Meyer is the name of:

 Stefan Meyer (ice hockey) (born 1985), Canadian ice hockey player
 Stefan Meyer (physicist) (1872–1949), Austrian physicist